Kingpin is a 1996 American sports comedy film directed by Peter and Bobby Farrelly and written by Barry Fanaro and Mort Nathan. Starring Woody Harrelson, Randy Quaid, Vanessa Angel and Bill Murray, it tells the story of an alcoholic ex-professional bowler (Harrelson) who becomes the manager for a promising Amish talent (Quaid). It was filmed in and around Pittsburgh, Pennsylvania, as a stand-in for Scranton, Amish country, and Reno, Nevada.

The film was released on July 26, 1996 with a budget of $25 million, and grossed $32.2 million.

Plot

Flashy young bowler Roy Munson wins the 1979 Iowa state bowling championship and leaves home to turn professional. In his professional bowling tour debut, he defeats established pro Ernie McCracken, who takes the loss poorly and seeks revenge. 

McCracken convinces Roy to help him hustle a group of local amateur bowlers. When they realize they were conned, McCracken flees while Roy is brutally beaten and loses his hand when it is forced into the ball return, ending his career. 

17 years later, Roy uses a prosthetic hand to display his championship ring and is living in Scranton, Pennsylvania, an alcoholic, unsuccessful traveling salesman of bowling supplies. Always behind on his rent, he is constantly harassed by his landlady, Mrs. Dumars, eventually being reduced to trade sexual favors for a break on his back rent.

On a sales visit to a bowling alley, Roy meets Ishmael Boorg. Roy tries to convince him to turn pro, with him as manager. Ishmael declines, explaining he is from the local Amish community, that his bowling hobby must be kept secret from his family. Roy then sees a poster in a bowling magazine advertising a $1 million winner-take-all tournament in Reno, Nevada. Learning that Ishmael's family is about to lose their farm to the bank, Roy eventually convinces them to let him join him, under the guise of going on a mission trip.

Roy discovers that the childlike Ishmael is not aware of some of bowling's basic rules and skills. (His 270 average was because he was taught to bowl fifteen frames and not the standard ten.) However, after some coaching, Ishmael improves. 

The duo earn money in various local tournaments and by hustling bowlers. Ishmael defeats wealthy bowling enthusiast Stanley Osmanski, but he attacks the duo after discovering that the roll of cash Roy put up was fake. As the group flee Osmanski's mansion, his girlfriend Claudia, who had also been a victim of Osmanski's violence, joins them. 

Roy suspects Claudia has ulterior motives and is distracting Ishmael. After Roy gets in a fistfight with her, Ishmael flees. During his absence, they drive on and end up back in Roy's hometown and at his abandoned childhood home, as his father died ten years earlier. Roy then confesses to Claudia he never returned out of shame for his failure as a pro bowler, not even for his father's funeral. They eventually call a truce, find Ishmael and continue on to Reno.

In Reno, they run into McCracken, who is now a national bowling superstar. He insults and makes fun of Roy and infuriates Ishmael, who attempts to punch McCracken but instead hits a wall and breaks his hand, leaving him unable to bowl. Later on, Claudia disappears with all of their money when Stanley finds her. Feeling distraught, Ishmael convinces Roy that they still have a chance to win $1 million if Roy bowls. 

Roy enters the tournament, rolling the ball with his prosthetic rubber hand. He rediscovers his touch, progresses through several rounds, and eventually ends up in the televised finals against McCracken. During the final match, Ishmael's brother arrives and takes him back to Pennsylvania. When Roy realizes he is alone, he struggles and McCracken wins the tournament by one pin.

Afterwards, Roy returns to his Pennsylvania apartment and pours his liquor down the drain. He is visited by Claudia, who explains she had disappeared with Stanley in Reno to keep him from hurting Roy and Ishmael. She made Stanley believe she was running away with McCracken to give McCracken payback off-screen, and confesses her love for Roy, offering him the money Stanley earned from betting on McCracken in the finals. Roy responds that he is going to make $500,000 in an endorsement deal for Trojan Condoms based on his prosthetic rubber hand. 

Roy and Claudia visit Ishmael's family home, who'd told his parents about Ishmael's forbidden bowling career, but also about the moral strength and decency he showed during his travels. Roy tells them how Ishmael straightened out both of their lives, as Roy has finally given up drinking. The Boorg family's debts are paid off with his endorsement check, and Roy and Claudia kiss before driving away together.

Cast
 Woody Harrelson as Roy Munson
 Will Rothhaar as young Roy
 Randy Quaid as Ishmael Boorg
 Vanessa Angel as Claudia
 Bill Murray as Ernie "Big Ern" McCracken
 Lin Shaye as Mrs. Dumars
 Rob Moran as Stanley Osmanski, Claudia's ex-boyfriend
 Chris Elliott as the gambler
 Chris Schenkel as himself
 Morganna, the Kissing Bandit as herself
 P. W. Evans as himself

Cast notes:
Major league baseball pitcher Roger Clemens appears in a cameo as the character Skidmark during the restaurant scene.
Professional bowlers Parker Bohn III, Randy Pedersen and Mark Roth appear as opponents that Roy Munson defeats on his way to the final match in Reno against McCracken.
The film also features several musical acts. Jonathan Richman — who would play an even bigger musical role in the Farrelly brothers' next film There's Something About Mary —  fronts the band performing in the restaurant scene. Urge Overkill performs the national anthem at the tournament in Reno, while John Popper appears as the master of ceremony. In the film's final scene, Popper's band Blues Traveler perform their song "But Anyway" while dressed in traditional Amish clothing.
According to the Farrelly brothers, Michael Keaton, Chris Farley and Charles Rocket were considered for the roles played by Harrelson, Quaid and Murray respectively. Jim Carrey was the first choice for the role of Ernie McCracken.

Reception
Rotten Tomatoes gives the film a 49% approval rating based on 39 reviews, with an average rating of 5.7/10. The site's consensus, "Kingpin has its moments, but they're often offset by an eagerness to descend into vulgar mean-spiritedness." On Metacritic, based on 14 reviews, the film holds a score of 43 out of 100, indicating "mixed or average reviews". Audiences surveyed by CinemaScore gave the film a grade of "B−" on a scale of A+ to F.

Roger Ebert had one of the more noteworthy positive reviews, giving it three and a half out of four stars. Gene Siskel also endorsed the film, putting it on his list of the ten best films for 1996.

Nancy Gerstman mentioned the film as one of the nine most underrated films in the 1990s.

The film is ranked #68 on Bravo's "100 Funniest Movies". 
In 2018 Vulture.com listed it at #2 on a list of Woody Harrelson's best films.

Home media
When released on DVD, Kingpin came in its original PG-13 theatrical version (113 minutes) and an extended, R-rated version (117 minutes). Both versions are available on the Blu-Ray disc issued by Paramount Pictures on October 14, 2014.

References

External links

 

1996 films
American buddy comedy films
1990s comedy road movies
1990s sports comedy films
American comedy road movies
American slapstick comedy films
American sports comedy films
Amish in films
Ten-pin bowling films
1990s buddy comedy films
Films about alcoholism
Films about amputees
Films directed by the Farrelly brothers
Films set in 1969
Films set in 1979
Films set in 1996
Films set in Iowa
Films set in Pennsylvania
Films set in Pittsburgh
Films set in Reno, Nevada
Films shot in New York (state)
Films shot in Pittsburgh
Films shot in Nevada
Metro-Goldwyn-Mayer films
Rysher Entertainment films
1996 comedy films
1996 directorial debut films
1990s English-language films
1990s American films